The 2018 Vermont House of Representatives elections took place as part of the biennial United States elections. Vermont voters will elect state representatives in all 150 seats. State representatives serve two-year terms in the Vermont House of Representatives. A primary election on August 14, 2018, determined which candidates appeared on the November 6 general election ballot.

Following the 2016 State House elections, Democrats maintained effective control of the House with a 97 member caucus (83 Democrats, 7 Independents, and 7 Progressives). Before the election, to take control of the chamber from Democrats, the Republicans would have needed to net 23 State House seats. However, instead the Democrats instead gained 12 seats, increasing their majorities.

Summary of Results by State House District
Primary election results can be obtained from the Vermont Secretary of State's website.

Incumbents not seeking re-election

Retiring incumbents
28 incumbent Representatives (17 Democrats and 11 Republicans) are not seeking re-election in 2018:

David Sharpe (D), Addison-4
Bill Botzow (D), Bennington-1
Rachael Fields (D), Bennington-2-1
Kiah Morris (D), Bennington-2-2
Alice Miller (D), Bennington-3
Janssen Willhoit (R), Caledonia-3 (Running for Attorney General)
Richard Lawrence (R), Caledonia-4
Helen Head (D), Chittenden-7-3
Betsy Dunn (D), Chittenden-8-1
James Condon (D), Chittenden-9-1
Maureen Dakin (D), Chittenden-9-2
Donald H. Turner (R), Chittenden-10 (Running for Lieutenant Governor)
Kathleen Keenan (D), Franklin-3-1
Corey Parent (R), Franklin-3-1
Steve Beyor (R), Franklin-5
Albert Pearce (R), Franklin-5
Daniel Connor (D), Franklin-6
Bernard Juskiewicz (R), Lamoille-3
Robert Frenier (R), Orange-1
Gary Viens (R), Orleans-2
Douglas Gage (R), Rutland-5-4
Stephen Carr (D), Rutland-6
Dennis Devereux (R), Rutland-Windsor-2
Patti Lewis (R), Washington-1
Michael Hebert (R), Windham-1
David Deen (D), Windham-4
Susan Buckholz (D), Windsor-4-1
Gabrielle Lucke (D), Windsor-4-2

Defeated in primary
Valerie Stuart (D), Windham-2-1
Paul Belaski (D), Windsor-1

Detailed Results by State House District
Note: Primary Election results are only shown for contested primaries. For information on non-contested primary elections, refer to the Vermont Secretary of State's website.

Sources:

Addison-1
The Addison-1 district has 2 seats in the Vermont House of Representatives.

Addison-2
The Addison-2 district has 1 seat in the Vermont House of Representatives.

Addison-3
The Addison-3 district has 2 seats in the Vermont House of Representatives.

Addison-4
The Addison-4 district has 2 seats in the Vermont House of Representatives.

Addison-5
The Addison-5 district has 1 seat in the Vermont House of Representatives.

Addison-Rutland
The Addison-Rutland district has 1 seat in the Vermont House of Representatives.

Bennington-1
The Bennington-1 district has 1 seat in the Vermont House of Representatives.

Bennington-2-1
The Bennington-2-1 district has 2 seats in the Vermont House of Representatives.

Bennington-2-2
The Bennington-2-2 district has 2 seats in the Vermont House of Representatives.

Bennington-3
The Bennington-3 district has 1 seat in the Vermont House of Representatives.

Bennington-4
The Bennington-4 district has 2 seats in the Vermont House of Representatives.

Bennington-Rutland
The Bennington-Rutland district has 1 seat in the Vermont House of Representatives.

Caledonia-1
The Caledonia-1 district has 1 seat in the Vermont House of Representatives.

Caledonia-2
The Caledonia-2 district has 1 seat in the Vermont House of Representatives.

Caledonia-3
The Caledonia-3 district has 2 seats in the Vermont House of Representatives.

Caledonia-4
The Caledonia-4 district has 2 seats in the Vermont House of Representatives.

Caledonia-Washington
The Caledonia-Washington district has 1 seat in the Vermont House of Representatives.

Chittenden-1
The Chittenden-1 district has 1 seat in the Vermont House of Representatives.

Chittenden-2
The Chittenden-2 district has 2 seats in the Vermont House of Representatives.

Chittenden-3
The Chittenden-3 district has 2 seats in the Vermont House of Representatives.

Chittenden-4-1
The Chittenden-4-1 district has 1 seat in the Vermont House of Representatives.

Chittenden-4-2
The Chittenden-4-2 district has 1 seat in the Vermont House of Representatives.

Chittenden-5-1
The Chittenden-5-1 district has 1 seat in the Vermont House of Representatives.

Chittenden-5-2
The Chittenden-5-2 district has 1 seat in the Vermont House of Representatives.

Chittenden-6-1
The Chittenden-6-1 district has 2 seats in the Vermont House of Representatives.

Chittenden-6-2
The Chittenden-6-2 district has 1 seat in the Vermont House of Representatives.

Chittenden-6-3
The Chittenden-6-3 district has 2 seats in the Vermont House of Representatives.

Chittenden-6-4
The Chittenden-6-4 district has 2 seats in the Vermont House of Representatives.

Chittenden-6-5
The Chittenden-6-5 district has 2 seats in the Vermont House of Representatives.

Chittenden-6-6
The Chittenden-6-6 district has 1 seat in the Vermont House of Representatives.

Chittenden-6-7
The Chittenden-6-7 district has 2 seats in the Vermont House of Representatives.

Chittenden-7-1
The Chittenden-7-1 district has 1 seat in the Vermont House of Representatives.

Chittenden-7-2
The Chittenden-7-2 district has 1 seat in the Vermont House of Representatives.

Chittenden-7-3
The Chittenden-7-3 district has 1 seat in the Vermont House of Representatives.

Chittenden-7-4
The Chittenden-7-4 district has 1 seat in the Vermont House of Representatives.

Chittenden-8-1
The Chittenden-8-1 district has 2 seats in the Vermont House of Representatives.

Chittenden-8-2
The Chittenden-8-2 district has 2 seats in the Vermont House of Representatives.

Chittenden-8-3
The Chittenden-8-3 district has 1 seat in the Vermont House of Representatives.

Chittenden-9-1
The Chittenden-9-1 district has 2 seats in the Vermont House of Representatives.

Chittenden-9-2
The Chittenden-9-2 district has 2 seats in the Vermont House of Representatives.
Due to a tie on the August 14 primary election day, a re-vote for the final spot of the Republican line a re-vote was held on September 10, 2018. Pam Loranger defeated John Nagle III in the runoff.

Chittenden-10
The Chittenden-10 district has 2 seats in the Vermont House of Representatives.

Essex-Caledonia
The Essex-Caledonia district has 1 seat in the Vermont House of Representatives.

Essex-Caledonia-Orleans
The Essex-Caledonia-Orleans district has 1 seat in the Vermont House of Representatives.

Franklin-1
The Franklin-1 district has 1 seat in the Vermont House of Representatives.

Franklin-2
The Franklin-2 district has 1 seat in the Vermont House of Representatives.

Franklin-3-1
The Franklin-3-1 district has 2 seats in the Vermont House of Representatives.

Franklin-3-2
The Franklin-3-2 district has 1 seat in the Vermont House of Representatives.

Franklin-4
The Franklin-4 district has 2 seats in the Vermont House of Representatives.

Franklin-5
The Franklin-5 district has 2 seats in the Vermont House of Representatives.

Franklin-6
The Franklin-6 district has 1 seat in the Vermont House of Representatives.

Franklin-7
The Franklin-7 district has 1 seat in the Vermont House of Representatives.

Grand Isle-Chittenden
The Grand Isle-Chittenden district has 2 seats in the Vermont House of Representatives.

Lamoille-1
The Lamoille-1 district has 1 seat in the Vermont House of Representatives.

Lamoille-2
The Lamoille-2 district has 2 seats in the Vermont House of Representatives.

Lamoille-3
The Lamoille-3 district has 1 seat in the Vermont House of Representatives.

Lamoille-Washington
The Lamoille-Washington district has 2 seats in the Vermont House of Representatives.

Orange-1
The Orange-1 district has 2 seats in the Vermont House of Representatives.

Orange-2
The Orange-2 district has 1 seat in the Vermont House of Representatives.

Orange-Caledonia
The Orange-Caledonia district has 1 seat in the Vermont House of Representatives.

Orange-Washington-Addison
The Orange-Washington-Addison district has 2 seats in the Vermont House of Representatives.

Orleans-1
The Orleans-1 district has 2 seats in the Vermont House of Representatives.

Orleans-2
The Orleans-2 district has 2 seats in the Vermont House of Representatives.

Orleans-Caledonia
The Orleans-Caledonia district has 2 seats in the Vermont House of Representatives.

Orleans-Lamoille
The Orleans-Lamoille district has 1 seat in the Vermont House of Representatives.

Rutland-1
The Rutland-1 district has 1 seat in the Vermont House of Representatives.

Rutland-2
The Rutland-2 district has 2 seats in the Vermont House of Representatives.

Rutland-3
The Rutland-3 district has 2 seats in the Vermont House of Representatives.

Rutland-4
The Rutland-4 district has 1 seat in the Vermont House of Representatives.

Rutland-5-1
The Rutland-5-1 district has 1 seat in the Vermont House of Representatives.

Rutland-5-2
The Rutland-5-2 district has 1 seat in the Vermont House of Representatives.

Rutland-5-3
The Rutland-5-3 district has 1 seat in the Vermont House of Representatives.

Rutland-5-4
The Rutland-5-4 district has 1 seat in the Vermont House of Representatives.

Rutland-6
The Rutland-6 district has 2 seats in the Vermont House of Representatives.

Rutland-Bennington
The Rutland-Bennington district has 1 seat in the Vermont House of Representatives.

Rutland-Windsor-1
The Rutland-Windsor-1 district has 1 seat in the Vermont House of Representatives.

Rutland-Windsor-2
The Rutland-Windsor-2 district has 1 seat in the Vermont House of Representatives.

Washington-1
The Washington-1 district has 2 seats in the Vermont House of Representatives.

Washington-2
The Washington-2 district has 2 seats in the Vermont House of Representatives.

Washington-3
The Washington-3 district has 2 seats in the Vermont House of Representatives.

Washington-4
The Washington-4 district has 2 seats in the Vermont House of Representatives.

Washington-5
The Washington-5 district has 1 seat in the Vermont House of Representatives.

Washington-6
The Washington-6 district has 1 seat in the Vermont House of Representatives.

Washington-7
The Washington-7 district has 2 seats in the Vermont House of Representatives.

Washington-Chittenden
The Washington-Chittenden district has 2 seats in the Vermont House of Representatives.

Windham-1
The Windham-1 district has 1 seat in the Vermont House of Representatives.

Windham-2-1
The Windham-2-1 district has 1 seat in the Vermont House of Representatives.

Windham-2-2
The Windham-2-2 district has 1 seat in the Vermont House of Representatives.

Windham-2-3
The Windham-2-3 district has 1 seat in the Vermont House of Representatives.

Windham-3
The Windham-3 district has 2 seats in the Vermont House of Representatives.

Windham-4
The Windham-4 district has 2 seats in the Vermont House of Representatives.

Windham-5
The Windham-5 district has 1 seat in the Vermont House of Representatives.

Windham-6
The Windham-6 district has 1 seat in the Vermont House of Representatives.

Windham-Bennington
The Windham-Bennington district has 1 seat in the Vermont House of Representatives.

Windham-Bennington-Windsor
The Windham-Bennington-Windsor district has 1 seat in the Vermont House of Representatives.

Windsor-1
The Windsor-1 district has 2 seats in the Vermont House of Representatives.

Windsor-2
The Windsor-2 district has 1 seat in the Vermont House of Representatives.

Windsor-3-1
The Windsor-3-1 district has 1 seat in the Vermont House of Representatives.

Windsor-3-2
The Windsor-3-2 district has 2 seats in the Vermont House of Representatives.

Windsor-4-1
The Windsor-4-1 district has 1 seat in the Vermont House of Representatives.

Windsor-4-2
The Windsor-4-2 district has 2 seats in the Vermont House of Representatives.

Windsor-5
The Windsor-5 district has 1 seat in the Vermont House of Representatives.

Windsor-Orange-1
The Windsor-Orange-1 district has 1 seat in the Vermont House of Representatives.

Windsor-Orange-2
The Windsor-Orange-2 district has 2 seats in the Vermont House of Representatives.

Windsor-Rutland
The Windsor-Rutland district has 1 seat in the Vermont House of Representatives.

See also
United States elections, 2018
United States Senate election in Vermont, 2018
United States House of Representatives election in Vermont, 2018
Vermont gubernatorial election, 2018
Vermont State Senate election, 2018
Vermont elections, 2018

Notes

References

House
Vermont House of Representatives elections
Vermont House of Representatives